Ripenda Kosi is a village in the Labin municipality in Istria County, Croatia.

References

Populated places in Istria County